The 2017 Italian Basketball Supercup, also called Prozis Supercoppa 2017 for sponsorship reasons, was the 23rd edition of the super cup tournament, organized by the Lega Basket Serie A (LBA).

EA7 Emporio Armani Milano were the defending champions.

EA7 Emporio Armani Milano went to win his 2nd Supercup by beating Umana Reyer Venezia 82–77 in the Finals. Jordan Theodore was named MVP of the competition.

It was played in the Unieuro Arena in Forlì on 23 and 24 September 2017.

Participant teams
As of 22 September 2017, qualified for the tournament were Banco di Sardegna Sassari, EA7 Emporio Armani Milano, Umana Reyer Venezia and Dolomiti Energia Trento.

Bracket

Semi-finals

EA7 Emporio Armani Milano vs. Dolomiti Energia Trento

Umana Reyer Venezia vs. Banco di Sardegna Sassari

Final

EA7 Emporio Armani Milano vs. Umana Reyer Venezia

Sponsors

References

External links
 LBA official website

Italian Basketball Cup
2017–18 in Italian basketball